American singer-songwriter Madonna is considered a fashion and style icon. Fashion critics, designers and scholars have examined her influence in fashion from different stages. Her connection with the fashion community was labeled a symbiotic relationship and helped shape views on her. Madonna's industry ventures include owning fashion brands and appearing at events such as the Met Gala.

Madonna has collaborated with an array of people from the community, including designers, photographers and stylists. She became a muse for many of them, and during the MTV Generation, her in-depth involved collaborative friendships were credited with making routine collaborations between artists and designers, and for reinforcing the connection with the fashion and music industries further than before. Madonna was also credited with boosting the careers of various designers, including then-emerging to as well-established ones, as well fashion houses. Many of them have cited Madonna as a career influence. She became the first musician on the covers of The Big Four, and under Anna Wintour's control, Madonna became the first musical artist to grace a Vogue cover in 1989 after a notable time with a focus on fashion models.  

Over decades, Madonna set numerous fashion trends. Unconventional compared to enduring glamorous icons, aspects of her styles, looks, and clothing have influenced the public and other entertainers of different generations. Madonna's photoshoots and personal belongings have been displayed in museums and other exhibitions. Nicknamed variously from "Queen of Fashion" to "Queen of Kitsch", Madonna appeared on industry lists of the best and worst dresses. She also earned a reputation as a fashion provocateur, receiving criticism from the religious sector, and from organizations like PETA. Her provocative fashion statements received further criticism as she aged. Her decades-long impact have been addressed by observers from Arianne Phillips to Diane Asitimbay, and she has appeared in a number of all-time lists focused on individuals' fashion influence or by musicians. She received various awards for her fashion, and in her prime both Vogue and Karl Lagerfeld named her the "single greatest fashion influence in the world", while Jean-Paul Gaultier called her "the biggest fashion icon" in the early 2010s.

Overview

Background
Many authors have traced Madonna's relationship with fashion back to her childhood. Without realizing it, her father influenced her fashion awareness with the dress code imposed in her strict Catholic upbringing, seeing "how potent a certain way of dress could be". Various sources have agreed that Madonna saw clothes as a tool of rebellion from early on. Mary Cross described that after  losing her mother, she "deliberately wore mismatched socks and clothes" as she refused to wear the identical outfits in which housekeeper-turned-stepmother Joan Gustafson liked to dress them. She continued to express herself through fashion as a student, without shaving her underarms and not wearing make-up. Mark Bego wrote she "pioneered" new ways to get noticed on the school playground with her style and attitude.

Critical vindication

Associate professor José Blanco explained that fashion critics, designers and scholars have examined her influence in fashion. In 2018, Louise Gray of i-D held that she "has come under scrutiny for her outfits over the best part of four decades". Indeed, some credit her sense of style and its evolution, as a key to her significance and success. In addition, Madonna has been called a fashion icon, as well as a fashion leader, idol, influencer or style icon. By 2005, scholar Camille Paglia described "she has become a fashion icon more than a music pioneer".

Many have expressed their feelings about this relationship over the years. In the early 2000s, American costume designer Arianne Phillips referred to the "unique relationship Madonna has with fashion and fashion has with Madonna". In similar remarks, both Vogue and website Trendencias have described it as a "symbiotic" relationship.

Fashion sense 

Madonna's use and development of her fashion sense have been discussed. In Oh Fashion (1994) by professors Shari Benstock and Suzanne Ferriss, it was explained that fashion is something "inseparable from her aesthetic practices", and this includes several "cultural interventions" such as her music videos, films, TV appearances or concerts in order to cultivate her image. Writing for The Journal of Popular Culture in 2015, scholar José Blanco explains that she uses clothes as a "cultural signifier to communicate her persona du jour".

For many, her looks and style were "at the center" of her staging and creative performances. While working with Madonna, costume designer Marlene Stewart commented in 1990, that for costumes the singer thinks in terms of story and character. Arianne Phillips also remarked on her "ability to create characters and tell a story through costumes". An observer also stated that she has extensively explored the roles she wishes to play when she grows up through clothing ever since. Agents like Erin Skarda from Time  stated that she never lost "control of her look".

Madonna herself has talked about fashion sense in various settings. Laura Tortora from Vogue Italia felt that the 1983 interview with J. Randy Taraborrelli, reveals how she was aware of her "great potential" and that she would make a legacy, not only in music, but also in "the history of costume". In 2007, she told the press: "I've made no secret of my love for fashion and trends".

Styles 

The evolution of her styles and looks have been "documented through the years". It was described as an "expansive catalogue of looks".

By 1990, Stewart gives Madonna almost full credit for "creating" her clothing style. French fashion magazine Crash said that she is known for having "extravagant taste" when it comes to style on stage. Richard Corman, one of the first photographers in collaborate with her, commented retrospectively about their encounter in 1983:

Justyna Stępień from the University of Lodz, described her work and style as a representation of the Camp-Lite phenomenon. J. Randy Taraborrelli wrote that religious symbols became a crucial part of the Madonna fashion craze. Laura Tortora from Vogue Italia credited Madonna as virtually the first to wear crucifixes as fashion accessories in a forward way. Sydney Nowak of KOST noted the singer brings a tinge of grunge to any outfit, as well as being a proponent of all black outfits. She wore long dresses several times in the mid-1990s.

Among the different styles explored by Madonna, are cowgirl, ghetto fabulous and military, masculine pieces and androgynous imagery. She has also paid tribute through clothes to other women such as Marilyn Monroe, Marie Antoinette and Eva Perón.

Referential activities

Madonna attended to various Met Gala, with her first being in 1997. Madonna has also participated in a number of fashion runways, including Jean-Paul Gaultier's 1992 amfAR runway where it showed a topless Madonna; the staff of Billboard included that moment among "the most iconic moments in the history of fashion, music or breasts". She closed the Gaultier 1995 Spring Collection, wearing a slip dress and pushing an antique baby carriage from which she lifted a young pup. Back in 1992, Madonna participated in a Dolce and Gabbana runway show, and American fashion historian Valerie Steele considered it publicized their friendship. Madonna made appearances at other fashion shows, including the Marc Jacobs 2010 Spring Collection.

Fashion connotations of her works have been addressed. Thomas R. Harrison, an associate professor at Jacksonville University, wrote "Vogue" showcased her "knowledge" of the professional fashion industry. For Allison Berry from Time magazine, this single is perhaps "the most fashion song of all time"; Berry also noted that with the spoken word Strike a Pose she pays tribute to fashion icons of Hollywood. The Guide Liverpool, called Madonna the "Queen of the Catwalk" thanks to "Vogue". British author Lucy O'Brien noticed that "Dress You Up" uses fashion as a metaphor, as is sung "by a woman clearly addicted to clothes". The video of "American Life" was seen as a reflection of anti-fashion industry statements.

Madonna told Kim Kardashian during the  premiere of her documentary film Madame X that she has preserved many of her outfits and that the fashion archive is located in Brooklyn. In 2013, Madonna hand-picked pieces from her fashion archives, and contributed to Madonna's Fashion Evolutions, a pop-up exhibition on the history of Madonna's fashion at Macy's curated and styled by Arianne Phillips. The singer declared: "... exhibition will give my fans a great opportunity to see the evolution of my style over the years".

Criticisms and ambiguity 

Authors of The 1980s (2007), believed that "Madonna's influence on fashion eclipsed her music". Madonna has a reputation for being a fashion provocateur, as Megan Friedman from Elle noted in 2016, she has "spent decades wearing outrageous outfits and stoking controversy". Bimini Bon Boulash talked the "countless articles" in Google's results for her "most shocking outfits of all time". American critic Christopher Glazek also commented that her costume changes attracted harassment from tabloid moralists. It intensified while aging. In Too Much (2020), author said "Madonna is perhaps the most famous example of a woman rigorously censured for dressing provocatively".

Madonna also received criticism for her religious-mixed fashion, and from animal rights groups like PETA. "When you see Madonna in fur, you realize why nobody has copied her style since 1984", they wrote in their 2009 online poll of the "Worst Dressed Celebrity", that Madonna topped. Rabbi Shmuley Boteach criticizes Madonna for helping create a "tragic world" among American adolescent girls.

Friedman, however, is of the opinion that is how Madonna is, so some "shock value" is to be expected, and yet "people still criticized her for wearing a too-revealing outfit". For Lauren Alexis Fisher of Harper's Bazaar, Madonna "mastered the art of shocking people through fashion". Jacorey Moon from Yahoo agreed that she always creates eye-catching fashion moments. Barbara Foley from Los Angeles Times, commented in 1990, that she has received better commentaries for her fashion sense than any of her other roles: "Through it all, including criticisms and counter-criticisms that she can't sing, can't act, can't keep her personal life together, no one has questioned her reputation as fashion's leading chameleon [...]". To Laura Craik of The Daily Telegraph, Madonna has been "brazen and unapologetic", but found it paved the way for a host of female performers to take to the stage wearing liberating, provocative costumes that defined their sexuality on their own terms.

Madonna has been included in media polls for worst and best dressed over the years. She was simultaneously included in both categories of the 1985 Rolling Stone polls, and in Spins first annual readers poll in 1989, where she was ranked first in both categories. The magazine staff declared: "Madonna: Breaking down the boundaries of good and bad taste". Designer Patricia Field once commented: "I've never seen her look foolish". In 1999, Vogue included her in the 100 Best Dressed List. However, Pamela Church Gibson of London College of Fashion noticed the absence of academic discussion around her within the pantheon of high fashion.

Collaborations with fashion houses and designers 

Patricia Cunningham from Wake Forest University, commented that Madonna's fashion connection extends to designers, claiming it has helped in creating her looks and even lyrics. In 2021, Euronews and Reuters commented about her collaborations: "Madonna has worked with almost every designer label imaginable in her lengthy career". According to the fashion journal Women's Wear Daily, then-rumored featuring costume pieces from 14 designers at Re-Invention World Tour, including Arianne Phillips, Stella McCartney, Christian Lacroix, and Karl Lagerfeld would represent an industry record. Various designers used her as a muse, while Stefano Gabbana once claimed "she is our often muse".

Alone her collaborative friendship with Gaultier generated commentary and headlines. Fashion journalist Tim Blanks called them "the quintessential rock star-fashion designer relationship" with a "mutually beneficial connection". Tom Rasmussen from Dazed stated: "Gaultier and Madonna made each other in so many ways. She gave him international notoriety, while he gave her cone-shaped breasts". Paloma Herce of Harper's Bazaar goes on to say that the singer-designer tandem had never made more sense with them.

Madonna's impact on them 

Authors and publications had observed a solid Madonna impact on various designers' careers. Mexican newspaper El Universal credited Madonna for boosting the career of "several" then-emerging designers like Olivier Theyskens, as well as how others from Tom Ford to Rick Owens, benefited directly from dressing her. Other publications have endorsed various of these examples and made similar claims. With regard to Theyskens, Fashion magazine stated that Madonna essentially put him "on the map". Arianne Phillips is another example; as she collaborated with Madonna for many years, Phillips told Daphne Merkin, "she's eclipsed my career". Gaultier has been also cited by more than one observer. In sum, Laura Craik from The Daily Telegraph commented that Madonna's patronage was guaranteed to catapult designers to the next level, whether they were a fledgling designer or a well-established one.

Madonna's impact in some fashion houses' brands was also commented on. Dolce & Gabbana "received their first international recognition thanks" to Madonna, according to independent scholar Juliana Tzvetkova, and author Brian Moeran wrote in The Magic of Fashion (2016), that Madonna "catapulted the designer duo into the limelight". In House of Versace (2010), Deborah Ball discussed Madonna's influence on Versace, saying the 1995 ads featuring her were "breakthrough", creating an association between the house and celebrities that garnered endless press coverage. After Madonna, Ball comments, Donatella drafted one celebrity after another. Nikolay Anguelov from the University of Massachusetts, made similar comments, saying that when Gianni hired Madonna for their 1995 campaign, it was a time when the employment of celebrities as models was not common, and thereafter it became not only common, but preferred. Others have addressed Madonna's impact on brands such as Chloé and Gucci. Madonna gave also hype in her generation to Manolo Blahnik's brand shoes.

She has had relationships with models such as Tony Ward and Jesus Luz, which have benefited their careers, according to the media. From Asian News International to The New York Times, they addressed Madonna's impact in Luz's career. Andy Lecompte, her hairstylist, told Refinery29 about the benefits of working with Madonna in his career.

Attributed effects in the industry
Marissa Muller from MTV once commented that before artists and brand collaborations were an every news item, Madonna was "bridging the worlds of music and fashion" with these alliances. Although there were precursors, the same editor writing for W credited Madonna as the first artist to make collaborations between designers "routine". Professor Martin S. Remland of West Chester University, considered Madonna's impact by saying that when both MTV and Madonna appeared, the marriage of music and fashion became more prominent than ever before.

British cultural historian Stephen Gundle gone further claiming that Madonna's collaborations with fashion designers "inspired a whole series of developments in popular music and entertainment", further saying that "new synergies occurred between different sectors". Jacob Bernstein from The New York Times made similar connotations, stating that Madonna opened a "standard operating procedure" but with stylists. He noted how a new generation of singers and actresses got stylists of their own, even ranked annually by The Hollywood Reporter.

Fashion and artistic photography 
Aside from fashion designers, Madonna has closely worked with various fashion, fine-art photographers and portraits. Photographic critic Vince Aletti described it as "rich creative relationships". In Madonna: Like an Icon, Lucy O'Brien described how various of them used Madonna as their muse. Before fame, she worked as a nude model in art schools for photographers such as Martin Schreiber and Lee Friedlander.

To Aletti, "photographic image has been at the forefront of Madonna's rise to iconic status". He said, Madonna doesn't merely pose for photographers like Herb Ritts, Steven Meisel and Mario Testino, she explicitly collaborates in the process. For French academic Georges-Claude Guilbert, after Madonna, the possibilities offered by the global village were never so "astutely exploited".

A number of publications have named her one of the most photographed women on the planet. Guilbert even classified her as one of at least, five most photographed woman in the world. Others, including The British Journal of Photography in 2006, called Madonna as "the most photographed woman in the world".

Photo exhibitions 

Many of Madonna's photoshoots have been displayed in arts festivals, pop-up exhibitions, galleries and other multimedia exhibitions. Schreibers' Madonna nude photos were part of the 2009 Brighton Fringe festival. They also went on display at the Australian Color Factory in 2016 under the title The Madonna Nudes II, as well as the 2022 Isetan exhibition Star Portrait: Young Marilyn and Madonna. Richard Corman installed Madonna – A Transformational Exhibition in 2013, which was a multimedia tour of Madonna's photographs taken by himself and displayed at W Hotels across the world.

In 2016, a Spanish exhibition named Madonna. El nacimiento de un mito was on display featuring her photos taken by Deborah Feingol, Peter Cunningham and George DuBose. The 50-photo exhibition was presented at La Térmica, and it included two videos from two artists, an artwork by Silvia Prada, and an installation where the audience "can be Madonna". In 2022, Japanese photographer Kenji Wakasugi exhibited Madonna - 1985 par Kenji Wakasugi at Galerie de l'Instant in France. In September 2023, according to Billboard, her photographs from Vanity Fairs inaugural European "Icon" project will be on display at the National Museum of the Royal Palace, Italy.

Madonna's image has been displayed at the National Portrait Gallery, United States by photographs taken by Francesco Scavullo, Kate Simon and Jeri Heiden, and is represented in the National Portrait Gallery, London by five photographs—two by Eric Watson and Testino each and one by Dafydd Jones. Various of her pictures went on auction, with some attaining figures in the five to nearly six figures, including works by Bettina Rheims, Lee Friedlander, and Helmut Newton.

Impact on some photographers 
A number of publications and photographers themselves commented on the impact of Madonna on their careers. Mario Testino stated he became known outside of his business. In a conversation with Nigel Farndale, he further explained that she was the first non-model to collaborate with him and credited: "With her I knew I had discovered my style". In 2004, fashion journalist Katie Grand noted constant references of Madonna in the works of Mert and Marcus.

Madonna persuaded Herb Ritts to make his videography debut, and finally directed her video "Cherish". Ritts told American Photo in 1989, "I don't know the first thing about video", admits, "but Madonna kept hounding me to do one for her, so I figured I'd give it a try".

Magazine covers and calendars 

Madonna also made an impact in the industry with her magazine covers, and as a cover girl. As of 2020, she had graced the covers of an estimated over 4,700 magazines worldwide, ranging from fan to high fashion periodicals  weighing six pounds. Imogen Tilden from The Guardian referred to her "modelling career" beginning with a The Village Voice assignment in 1981. Her ubiquity, that included multiple types of magazine was commented at large. Guilbert cites David Tetzlaff's commentary, a media scholar who once described her as ubiquitous at newsstands, and says "this alone makes Madonna a phenomenon worthy of analysis". For 1984 alone, an author believed she appeared on 117 magazine covers around the world.

Madonna's role as a cover girl was also commented on. Editor Matthew Rettenmund opined that she "made the act of being on the cover of a magazine into an art form" taking her covers "seriously". In Hollywood Goes Shopping (2000), editors commented that Madonna exploited the "model-like" look variegation. In 2020, Charlie Gowans-Eglinton, fashion editor of The New Zealand Herald reflected about Madonna's early influence and in the current generation:

Gowans-Eglinton, says Madonna is "really [...] an icon and will continue to be the poster girl [...] whatever your —or her— age" "She still as the ultimate Vogue cover star", the magazine declared in 2021.

Commercial view

Mark Bego once wrote that magazines or calendars "sell out in record numbers when her name or likeness is on them". In 1985, Penthouse and Playboy magazines published a number of nude photos of Madonna. They had their Madonna issues on newsstands weeks earlier than usual, and increased their print run up to 15 and 10 percent respectively. Madonna's issues in Penthouse and Playboy were distributed at 5 million copies. Madonna's American Vogue debut in 1989 was seen by Anna Wintour as "something extraordinary, like forty percent" of increase compared to previous issue.

Erika Stalder, in The Look Book (2019) wrote that Cindy Crawford and Madonna were the most featured cover girls of the 1980s and 1990s. In 1992 alone, Madonna was reported to be the most commercial cover girl in the United States. Also, more people picked up the cover of Madonna in 1992 on Entertainment Weekly (EW) than any other EW cover that year. Her 1997 March's Vanity Fair cover titled "Madonna and Child" was featured among the best-selling covers of 1998 with editor Graydon Carter commenting that "Madonna always sells phenomenally well". It registered 551,696 street copies. Infobae noted she has been featured in all of their international editions, selling its copies in matters of days.

Her cover issue for W in 2003, titled X-STaTIC PRo=Cess, became the magazine's best-selling edition. In the same year, a celebrity calendar firm in the UK placed Madonna at third among the best-selling woman in their 25th anniversary, and she was also ranked as the fifth all-time bestselling female celebrity calendar on Amazon UK in 2011.

Madonna has covers special anniversaries in some magazines. To celebrate their 50th anniversary, she graced four Cosmopolitan issues. She graced a special cover highlighting the 150th anniversary of Harper's Bazaar in 2017; an observer referred to her as a "favorite" for the magazine an noted her likeness in multiple editions. Commemorating their seventh anniversary, the staff of Spin highlighted two Madonna's covers in their own narrative of Genesis creation.

Feats
Madonna has achieved various feats in the sector. She is the first female entrepreneur to grace a Forbes cover according to themselves. Madonna became the inaugural cover for publications such as Spin (1985) and Shock from Colombia (1995). She was also the inaugural cover girl of Glamour for their Glamour Awards. Madonna also appeared more than any other person on the covers of Interview and Vanity Fair.
As of 2009, Madonna was the 10th person with most People cover magazines (13).

Madonna is the female artist with the most cover appearances on Rolling Stone either alone or including "collage" photoshoots, according to themselves. She is believed to be the first female figure on a cover for Rolling Stone special issues "Collectors edition". It's believed that Gaultier was the first designer to be featured on a magazine cover when he appeared in Glamour in 1990 along with Madonna. 

Under Anna Wintour's control, she became the first singer to be pictured on the cover of Vogue after a notable focus on models. Madonna also became the first singer to grace the covers of The Big Four and the only one until Rihanna matched this in 2021. In 2021, Madonna was the inaugural issue for L'Officiel Ibiza. About this collaboration, the magazine commented: "This project was born to pay a tribute to a contemporary icon who has defined, influenced and informed today's culture and aesthetics through her music and style". In 2022, Madonna was part of the first-ever NFT magazine covers designed by an NFT artist after Billboard partnership with World of Women. On January 2023, Madonna made the inaugural cover for Vanity Fairs European special issues "Icon" that cover their Italian, French and Spanish editions. The annual issue was made to celebrate the stars who "contribute[s] to shape the modern culture".

Impact in the sector
The South African website News24, said that it may be hard to believe, but there was a time when only models donned the covers of glossy magazines, and celebrities (mainly singers) only made an appearance on the pages inside. This was regarded as the norm, until Anna Wintour arrived at Vogue and put Madonna on the cover of Vogue, instead of a model, the website concludes. That decision was predicted to be a failure and received criticism from journals like The New York Times, according to El País. Wintour herself, declared that having a non-model was considered controversial at that time. Back in 1999, and also mentioning Wintour, Alex Kuczynski from The New York Times talked about how celebrities changed the old-time-focus of models on women's magazine covers. Previously Harper's Bazaar featured movie stars in decades prior. Editor Ben Widdicombe explained that fashion magazines of that time "provide a uniquely quantifiable gauge for the rise of celebrity influence" concluding that everything changed when Madonna appeared on the covers of British and American Vogue in 1989.

Listicles and depictions
In 2018, Rettenmund created a listicle for Logo TV named Madonna's 20 Most Essential Magazine Covers. He compiled 200 of her greatest cover magazines on his website, BoyCulture in 2014. In 2008, Hank Stuever from Washington Post celebrated Madonna's  50th birthday with a tour of some Madonna's magazine covers, saying: "The Material Girl has long been a cover girl, regularly gracing magazine covers for the last 25 years". Similarly, Emily Nussbaum showed a slideshow of 75 of her "great magazine covers" in a 2009 article for New York magazine. Jann S. Wenner included Madonna in his book Rolling Stone 50 Years of Covers (2018).

Fashion trends 

Over the course of various decades, Madonna earned a reputation as a fashion trendsetter. In Hollywood Goes Shopping (2000), David Desser and Garth Jowett named her a "perpetual fashion" trendsetter.

In 2000, American fashion scholar Harold Koda explained Madonna's effect, making the comparison with pieces like corsets worn with trousers and saying they would never realistically have been picked up by a lot of people, but when she does it, it becomes inscribed on the cultural consciousness. Kal Ruttenstein of Bloomingdale's describes that her influence "validates".

Continued influence 
As some trends initiated or propelled by Madonna have either remained or emerged again years later, an editor of L'Officiel commented that she marked "real periods". In 2015, Harper's Bazaar also mentioned "she cemented looks that remain culturally significant today". In 2021, Daisy Maldonado from Yahoo! described how she "catapulted trends we still wear today", prompting to add "world still following her trends". The same year, Carmen Martínez Pita from Cosmopolitan explored trends propelled by Madonna that are still in use. In 2023, Vanity Fair Italia analyzed Madonna's trends of a 40-year career through her hair, described as a Hairpedia, saying some of them still being sported. Design historian Jennifer Grayer Moore, delineates Madonna as a "catalyst for myriad long-lived fashion trends".

In a 2008 article for British Vogue, Julia Neel  described her as "always ahead of the trends". Writing for Elle in 2019, Charlotte Bitmead she has "been dictating make-up trends since the 80s".

Selected examples

While there were other contributors and factors, Madonna has been credited with helping popularize or initiate various fashion accessories and styles. Credits include lingerie as daywear, or popularizing the bustier fashion look. A number of publications have cited Madonna as the catalyst for starting the underwear as outerwear trend. Her stage performance at the 1984 MTV Video Music Awards is reported to mark the first time an artist's underwear was seen live on stage according to Silvia Maestrutti from Clarín. Harper's Bazaar commented that "pop stars still swear by her underwear-worn-as-outerwear look".

Madonna helped to propel the ponytail style in her generation, as she wore a sky-high blonde ponytail during her Blond Ambition World Tour. An observer, said: "I think that totally transformed how people saw the style, and absolutely launched its renaissance in fashion". According to Beth Shapouri from Glamour, Madonna's Blond Ambition ponytail is easily one of the most iconic hairstyles of all time. In Sociology (2013), authors explained that the singer Madonna had already pioneered a new style of celebrity involving genderbending.

Madonna made an impact using Asian fashion imagery, documented by various. Academics Douglas Kellner and Rhonda Hammer, concurred that "although Madonna did not initiate the Indian fashion accessories beauty", she did propel it into the public eye by attracting the attention of the worldwide media. Professor Christopher Partridge, similarly observed that "since Madonna first put Indian cultural symbols on the global fashion map, henna, bindis and Indian sartorial designs have become part of the global culture". Partridge, further adds that Madonna "ensured the Hindu invasion of Western popular musical space and made South Asian popular culture globally visible". Other authors like academic Madhulika S. Khandelwal, have cited Madonna as an important medium for popularizing mehndi (henna tattoos) in the 1990s.

Retail, campaigns and products 
Her figure in the fashion industry encompasses clothing and beauty products from others inspired by her, and her own fashion brands.

In the early to mid-1980s, manufacturers, including a company called 1045 Park Avenue, began to produce MTV-inspired fashion with key aspects of Madonna looks at that time. Fashion designer Maripol also ran a boutique in the East Village, New York City, called "Maripolitan" where some items were officially licensed by Madonna. Its selling and distribution was limited to the city.

Madonna signed a merchandising deal with a clothing manufacturer called Entertainers Merchandise Management Corp. and they operated under the name of Wazoo fashions. In turn, Wazoo distributed official Madonna clothes to department stores across the country, including Bullock's and Merry-Go-Round stores in shopping malls. In 1985, Macy's opened the department  store "Madonnaland" selling clothes  modeled after Madonna's style. Many other retailers followed suit. With the release of the movie Evita, inspired clothing and accessories were launched by Salvatore Ferragamo, cosmetics from Estée Lauder, and clothing in nine Bloomingdale's shops.

Lipsticks

Three lipsticks have been created for Madonna. Laura Mercier created the lipstick "M" for her film Evita (1996). The singer gave Mercier permission to market the shade as "Madonna Lip Color" becoming the first time she has allowed her name to be attached to a cosmetic product. Make Up For Ever and make-up artist Gina Brooke created the "Aqua Rogue/Iconic Red" (shade #8) for Madonna to wear on her MDNA Tour in 2012. Poppy King believes that Madonna "ushered red lipstick back in as a symbol of strength" and of "glamorous rebellion".

Russian Red (MAC Cosmetics): The "Russian Red" is the lipstick created by MAC Cosmetics, to wear on her Blond Ambition World Tour in 1990. Joanne Gair called it the bespoke MAC shade. The singer is credited  with making it popular, and an editor extensively explored how it made an impact for the Canadian brand. According to various fashion-targeted magazines in the 2010s and 2020s, it went to become a bestseller and still stands strong after decades. Allure commented "it's been a cult classic ever since", while Paloma Abad from Vogue Spain called it as "one of the seven cosmetic wonders. The same publication explained that Michael and Latoya Jackson or Linda Evangelista were among its most loyal buyers.

Fashion dolls

According to ABC News, in the 1980s Barbie "made a strong fashion statement" wearing outrageous, over-the-top outfits "inspired by MTV and Madonna". Professor Ann duCille commented about a time when Madonna "transformed underwear into outerwear" while Barbie also took to the streets in such clothes as see-through bustiers and spandex leggins. In Classic Country Toys: An Illustrated History of Americana (2022), author Bruce Wexler concurred that "fashion icons such as Jackie Kennedy and Madonna have also inspired Barbies clothes".

In 1987, author Cy Schneider noticed Madonna-inspired looks in Jem fashion dolls. Mattel Italian collaborators Mario Paglino and Gianni Grossi have portrayed Madonna in several fashion dolls that have been featured in a number of magazines and websites worldwide. They claimed that the singer inspired their foray into this field.

Madonna fashion brands and endorsements

Madonna made her first fashion endorsement in 1999 as the face of a Max Factor campaign. In 2007, Madonna launched in association with H&M a clothing line called "M by Madonna", the first collection of clothes she designed. According to Hindustan Times, she also became the "first celebrity with no designing experience to infiltrate the superstore's shelves".

Upon the launch of the "Material Girl" line in 2010, Erin Skarda from Time magazine said she stepped up her role in fashion. In 2023, Madonna launched the MDNA Skin, with an editor saying she helped raise the bar for quality among these celebrities ventures. In 2019, Madonna teamed up with Too Faced for the limited-release of two make-up box sets inspired by her stage looks of the Madame X era.

During her career, Madonna also became the face campaign for various fashion brands such as Louis Vuitton and Versace in multiple times.

Sales reception

The initial sales of clothing inspired by Madonna throughout the 20th century, impacted retail sales. Authors in Defining Visions (1998) described results saying: "No pop star had more impact on retail clothing sales than Madonna". Laura Mulvey also commented that "Madonna's performances make full use of the potential of cosmetics", and professor E. Ann Kaplan, noticed the numerous look alike Madonna contests, and the "successful exploitation" of her style by clothing companies which also attested the idolatry surrounded of her figure.

Macy's store sold out its Madonna-licensed fashions ("Madonaland") and jewelry within two days. Amid the height of MTV Generation, Michael Cortese, president of 1045 Park Avenue, compared the sales of the Michael Jackson-inspired line, describing it as "terrible". Terry Melville, Macy's fashion director, added that in contrast, Madonna's line was successful "because [she] brought a whole new way of dressing that was a total contrast to the menswear look for women that preceded it".

Throughout the first two decades of the 21st century, some accessories and fashion items related to Madonna saw a notorious sales increase. The red string used in Kabbalah gained a surge in sales. Retailer Boots reported a 72% rise in the sales of hair rollers after the release of "Hung Up". According to Antoine Arnault, everything worn in Madonna's Spring Summer Campaign for Louis Vuitton in 2009, sold out within months. Madonna's own fashion brands, obtained solid sales as well.

Selected wardrobe pieces 
In Oh Fashion (1994), by professors Shari Benstock and Suzanne Ferriss, it was said that many of her pieces achieved the status of popular to becoming cultural icons. Publications have frequently elaborated on "best Madonna looks" and similar lists, such as a 2020 list by L'Officiel that described Madonna pieces as marking the "history of music and fashion". Madonna has appeared on general-interest lists, including a 2021 Glamour list of "iconic fashion moments in music history", appearing twice, at the top and in the 24-position.

Like a Virgin-era dress
American journalist Lyndsey Parker, commented that her performance at the 1984 MTV Video Music Awards catapulted the singer to "superstar status", and its costume played a foremost role, as it seemed every girl in the United States wanted to be Madonna (or a "Madonnabe"). She defined the moment by saying: "No one had ever seen anything like it at the time". Parker further notes that "it remains such a signature look" that Madonna has referenced it in other performances.

White dress at the 1991 Academy awards 
Her World included the dress in Madonna's looks that "have influenced a generation of pop singers". According to Californian newspaper La Opinión, the 1991 Academy Awards marked a milestone in the history of the red carpet, when Madonna and Michael Jackson arrived together.

Madonna's Jean-Paul Gaultier pink conical-bra corset (Blond World Tour Ambition 1990)

According to the National Geographic Society "it quickly became one of many iconic looks associated with" her. To Tim Blanks, Madonna in her Gaultier cone-bra "is one of the most unforgettable images of the entire decade" (the 1990s). Another Magazines Jack Moss called it "an image of true pop culture ubiquity". It was suggested to be arguably Madonna's most seminal look, while Bryan Goh of Her World, said that entire look "has gone on to achieve cult status".

The cone bra has been described as more than just a part of fashion history, or an artefact hanging in a museum according to Liam Hess of Vogue, who said "its legacy lies in the very real way in which it has encouraged generations of female pop performers". While the cone bra existed before, the Madonna bra has since influenced numerous fashion designers and pop stars alike, wrote an editor from Entertainment Weekly in 2020.

Cultural depictions

Reenactments 

Many of her pieces have been recreated or inspired similar ones. According to Joanne Garde-Hansen from University of Gloucestershire, Madonna's Gaultier conical bra is one of her most emulated outfits. Some references are noted in Hocus Pocus by Stephanie Faracy, and inspired-like Lady Gaga (2009 MuchMusic Video Awards) or Cameron Diaz (photo shoot for V in 2009) among many others.

María Mérida from Vogue in its Spanish-language edition, noted the influence of the Like a Virgin-look dress saying that if "one of your looks turns into a Halloween costume, it is because you have achieved something important", and this style is still one of the most demanded at Halloween parties, Mérida claimed.

At auctions and other exhibitions

L'Officiel Brazil described that "her style influence has turned her garments into extremely valuable items".

The Guinness World Records listed a corset designed by Jean-Paul Gaultier sold at Christie's in London in May 1994 for $19,360 as the most ever paid for an item of clothing belonging to Madonna. However, numerous pieces of Madonna's clothing have since fetched higher prices. A 2001 Sotheby's online auction, sold another corset for $24,000, which, according to other publications surpassed the largest paid for a Madonna fashion item. The top-selling bra in history is believed to be a Madonna's bra. Other pieces such as the jacket worn at Desperately Seeking Susan raised $252,000 and a dress worn at the video of "Vogue", $179,200.

In 2014, a collection of dresses and outfits worn by Madonna in her music and film careers helped a celebrity auction raise $3.2m. In 2009, an exhibition in London named Simply Madonna: Materials Of The Girl featured 300 outfits, becoming the largest collection outside of Madonna's own. In 2010, another exhibition Simply Madonna was on display at Melbourne, Australia.

Influence and impact 
Madonna's fashion sense and its cultural impact were extensively discussed. The staff of Billboard commented in 2015, that "her sense of style became as influential as her chart-topping tunes". In Oh Fashion (1994) by professors Shari Benstock and Suzanne Ferriss, it was described: "Madonna's fashion moves generally caught shifts in cultural style and taste".

The influence of Madonna was so solid, that agents from Arianne Phillips to Diane Asitimbay made similar connotations by stating with the advent of Madonna, "fashion has never been the same" and she "changed fashion forever". Paloma Herce from fashion magazine Harper's Bazaar, in its Spanish-language edition, commented that she created a "before and after" period. American designer Todd Oldham, was quoted as saying that she is to fashion what the Big Bang theory is to the creation of the world.

In Muckraker  (2014), researcher Carlos Primo, music critic Javier Blánquez, journalist Daniel Arjona and philosopher Leticia García agreed that Madonna paved the road for a new way of understanding the relationship between fashion and show business. Cynthia Robins of San Francisco Chronicle further adds that "when Madonna came along, all fashion hell broke loose. She established a heady pace". Asitimbay stated that Madonna and Michael Jordan "did more for the fashion industry in the United States than many of our fashion models put together". By 2015, Suhani Pittie discussing the impact she reached, stated: "Probably no other woman in history has had such an impact on fashion as Madonna has".

Her fashion influence came from diverse sources; authors of The 1980s (2007), commented that "she influenced styles in so many ways via her music videos". She also did with tours. With her Blond Ambition World Tour alone, Drew Mackie from People magazine stated it "helped cement the link between pop costumes and couture". By 2008, Robert Verdi was quoted as saying, Madonna was a time, like an adjective in fashion, with people saying "this is so Madonna". In similar connotations, Anna Wintour and British author Michael Pye concurred that she "makes fashion happen", with Pye further adding that "she's fashion". Similarly, Mary Sollosi commented for Entertainment Weekly in 2022, she had an impact on what's in vogue every step of the way.

On public

Madonna's fashion impact on others is noted since the 1980s, or across multiple decades. According to Katya Foreman from BBC, her impact was eminent amid the youth culture of her generation, with a combination of attire and attitude. The most notorious group were young girls, known as the Madonna wannabes with an unusually high number of women began to dress like Madonna. Other female singers in the MTV Generation attained fashion impact, but "Madonna's persona and 'look' inspired the greatest fandom", noted professor  Gary Burns in A Companion to Popular Culture (2016). In The History of Rock and Roll (2012), Stuart Kallen expressed: "Madonna changed the way young women dressed virtually overnight". In reviewing that decade in 1990, Barbara Fole of Los Angeles Times called her "the woman who has influenced the fashion scene more than anyone else in the 1980s". Madonna's changing styles continued to influence women's fashion in the following years (and decades), but the 1980s are said to be the pinnacle of her fashion influence.

By the late 1990s, Canadian professor Karlene Faith commented that her "fashion influence has crossed generations", while editors of Rock Fashion (1999) described, "Madonna has been the top influence everywhere". In 2022, Amalissa Hall from Tatler said "she's inspired major fashion movements over the years" and at the height of her career, from the mid-1980s to the early 2000s, "whatever she wore, the public followed". In 2022, Pratik Aswal from Indian Institute of Art & Design, noticed that "her style is still imitated by her fans even today". Individuals like Alyson Walsh from The Guardian (2015) to Louise Gray of i-D (2018) and Stephen Doig from The Daily Telegraph (2023) have dedicated articles discussing ongoing Madonna's influence on them, or during her prime.

Influence on people of fashion industry

In 1990, Foley explained that "she inspires some of the biggest names in the clothing business". A 1999 article of Journal of American Culture from Bowling Green State University, described how during the 1980s and 1990s, aspects of Madonna's styles influenced the styles of leading designers in Paris and London. Her continued influence was felt or discussed in next decades. In 2021, a website called Dazz Fashion said "many designers" have been influenced by her style, and in 2015, an editor from Fashion Week Mexico concurred that she has been a "constant inspiration" on runway shows around the world. Simone Vertua of L'Officiel adds: "Madonna's style had influenced fashion designers to make unforgettable collaborations". In 2021, Vogue also remarked it, saying she had inspired collections of "various" designers.

Anna Sui credited Madonna for her inspiring to run her first runway show. German designer Michael Michalsky commented that he has taken inspiration from her in his collections.

Influence on entertainers

Madonna's style influenced other entertainers and was noted in numerous style celebrities and artists. In 2012, after decades since her debut, author Tom Streissguth was convinced that Madonna attitude has survived, as many female music and style celebrities have had a little bit of her in their style. Others have addressed the path Madonna paved including Vogue. About this whole point, Simone Vertua from L'Officiel argued "her looks have totally revolutionized the way of thinking of all the pop stars". An observer said that "before pop stars like Rihanna were fixtures at fashion shows, on the runway, and on fashion magazines, Madonna forged that frontier". Leah Melby Clinton of Glamour adds that "she totally paved the way for future pop-tart ladies".

Various individuals have publicly expressed Madonna's fashion influence on them. Alone in the 2010s and 2020s, Kelly Osbourne named Madonna as her biggest fashion influence, while celebrities such as Naomi Campbell and Rita Ora have cited her as one of her fashion icons. Kelly Brook also referred to her as her style icon while growing up.

Written works
Among Madonna's books, some of them have a central theme focused on either her style, evolution or magazine covers. As various photographers have edited more than one, and from a general sense, Maura Johnston commented "the variety of approaches writers, editors, and photographers have taken to craft their portraits is a testament to how her career has both inspired and provoked".

The following is a non-exhaustive list:

Style and fashion:
 Madonna: The Style Book (1992) by Debbie Voller 
 Madonna Style (2002) by Carol Clerk
 Madonna Style (2012) by Stacey Appel

Photography:
 Madonna Nude 1979: In the Beginning: A Photographic Tribute (2002) by Martin H. M. Schreiber
 Madonna: Nudes + (2017) by Schreiber
 Madonna NYC 83 (2013) by Richard Corman
 Madonna 66 (2016) by Corman

Magazines:
 MLVC60: Madonna's Most Amazing Magazine Covers: A Visual Record (2018) by Matthew Rettenmund

Accolades 

According to Harper's Bazaar, designers like Riccardo Tisci have paid tribute to Madonna. Simon Doonan paid homage to the singer in a slideshow at Barney's called The Mesmerizing Mistress of Perpetual Reinvention. In a 1985 interview, Michael Gross asked Madonna, "how do you feel about designers paying tribute to you?", and she responded "I'm very flattered".

Designers such as Riccardo Tisci, Donatella Versace and Karl Lagerfeld once expressed their admiration; Lagerfeld called her indeed "the single greatest fashion influence in the world". In 2019, Versace was commissioned by L'Officiel to write a special article about Madonna, and she became "reflective". Designer William Baker once said: "It's such a cliché now, but I was obsessed with Madonna and would regularly dress up as her".

Like Lagerfeld, Vogue magazine also proclaimed her as the "greatest single fashion influence" in the world. Similarly, Suhani Pittie said "it would not be wrong to say that she is in fact 'the' most influential women's fashion icon ever", while Jean-Paul Gaultier told Spanish press in 2012, that she is the "biggest fashion icon".

Listicles 
Madonna has appeared in a number of listicles and publications. Clothes Show London conducted a poll of the biggest fashion icons of the 20th century in 2009, divided by decades. Madonna won the 1980s section, with 75 percent —the highest sum attained by the other decade's winners. She was also included in Rolling Stone'''s list of musicians who defined the 1990s.

Awards and recognition

Madonna has received a number of awards for her fashion. She was honored with the Style Icon by Elle Style Awards in 2007, recognizing her contributions in the field, and for her ever-evolving image. She won various VH1 Fashion Awards, including the first Versace Award in 1998, as their panel agreed that "her career has been the model for the infusion of celebrity and glamour into fashion and in many ways created the fashion world as it is known today". Madonna was included in the International Best Dressed Hall of Fame List.

Madonna has been nicknamed variously, including being called a "Goddess of Fashion", "Queen of Style" or a "Queen of Fashion". Czech newspaper Mladá fronta DNES named her the "Queen of Fashion Trends" and the "Master of kitsch". She was also called the "Queen of Camp". An editor of fashion magazine Harper's Bazaar called her "Queen of Street Style". Designer Simon Doonan, in a similar connotation described that "Madonna is like an incredible patron saint for fashion".

 Museum and galleries exhibitions 
Many Madonna's clothing were part of diverse exhibitions throughout the world, including:
 Rock Style (December 9, 1999–March 19, 2000) — Metropolitan Museum of Art
 Extreme Beauty: The Body Transformed (December 6, 2001–March 17, 2002) — Metropolitan Museum of Art
 Kimono: Kyoto to Catwalk (2020) — Victoria and Albert Museum
 Cine y Moda (Cinema and Fashion) (2022) — Cinémathèque Française and La Caixa Foundation

Following a selected gallery of Madonna's clothing displayed at fashion museums or memorabilia exhibitions.

 See also 

 List of people on the cover of Attitude magazine
 List of people on the cover of GQ Russia
 Lists of Harper's Bazaar cover models
 List of people on the cover of i-D magazine
 List of Jane magazine cover models
 Lists of Playboy models
 Lists of covers of Time magazine
 List of TV Guide covers (1980s)
 List of TV Guide covers (1990s)
 List of V magazine cover models

 Notes 

 References 

Book sources

 
 
 
 
 
 
 
 
 
 
 
 
 
 
 
 
 
 
 
 
 
 
 
 
 
 
 
 
 
 
 
 
 
 
 
 +
 
 
 
 
 
 
 
 
 
 
 
 
 
 
 
 
 
 
 
 
 
 
 
 
 
 
 
 
 
 
 
 
 
 
 
 
 

Non-English books

 
 
 

External links
 Madonna at Vogue'' (website)

 
Fashion influencers
Fashion by people